Following is a list of football clubs located in Zanzibar, sorted alphabetically.

J
Jamhuri FC

K
KMKM
 Kikwajuni =Winner Wazazi cup 1985,   Third on Zanzibar championship 1993

M
Mafunzo F.C.
Malindi F.C.
Miembeni S.C.
Mundu Sport Club

Z
Zanzibar Ocean View

Zanzibar
Football clubs
Football clubs
Lists